Aspidoglossa sphaerodera is a species of ground beetle in the subfamily Scaritinae. It was described by Reiche in 1842.

References

Scaritinae
Beetles described in 1842